Siri Sangha Bodhi I, also known as Siri Sanghabodhi, was a monarch of Anuradhapura in the 3rd century, whose reign lasted from 252 to 254. He succeeded Sangha Tissa I as King of Anuradhapura and was succeeded by Gothabhaya.

Siri Sanghabodhi's story of devotion to Buddhism is told in the Mahāvaṃsa. The king was said to have been so committed to the Buddha's teachings that he refused to execute criminals. When his prime minister led a rebellion against him, he could not bear the thought of the bloodshed that would result from putting down the rebellion, so he voluntarily abdicated and retired to the forest to live as an ascetic. The prime minister, now King Gathabhaya, fearing the return of the rightful king, offered a reward to anyone who would bring him the head of Siri Sanghabodh. One day, a poor peasant shared his meal with Siri Sanghabodh who, having nothing to give him in return, informed the man of his identity and offered him his head, decapitating himself. Siri Sanghabodh is regarded as a great Buddhist saint in Sri Lanka.

See also
 List of Sri Lankan monarchs
 History of Sri Lanka

References

External links
 Kings & Rulers of Sri Lanka
 Codrington's Short History of Ceylon

S
S
Sinhalese Buddhist monarchs
S
S